Soldierpet is one of the oldest neighbourhoods in Visakhapatnam, Andhra Pradesh, India. In the 18th century the area was a residential colony for the British Army.

History
Soldierpet was formerly home to an Anglo-Indian community and resembles the backyards of Great Britain. The locality has several educational institutions.

The city is now expanding northward and has had problems with pollution.

References

Neighbourhoods in Visakhapatnam